Mohsen Naghavi is an Iranian-American researcher and Professor of Health Metrics Sciences at the University of Washington.
He is one of the top highly cited researchers (h>100) according to webometrics.

References 

Date of birth missing (living people)
Living people
University of Washington faculty
American epidemiologists
Iranian epidemiologists
University of Tehran alumni
Year of birth missing (living people)
American people of Iranian descent